The 2015 European Beach Volleyball Championships was held from July 28 to August 2, 2015 in Klagenfurt, Austria.

Men's tournament

Preliminary round

Pool A

|}

|}

Pool B

|}

|}

Pool C

|}

|}

Pool D

|}

|}

Pool E

|}

|}

Pool F

|}

|}

Pool G

|}

|}

Pool H

|}

|}

Knockout stage
A draw was held to determine the pairings.

Round of 24 

|}

Round of 16 

|}

Quarterfinals

|}

Semifinals

|}

Third place game

|}

Final

|}

Women's tournament

Preliminary round

Pool A

|}

|}

Pool B

|}

|}

Pool C

|}

|}

Pool D

|}

|}

Pool E

|}

|}

Pool F

|}

|}

Pool G

|}

|}

Pool H

|}

|}

Knockout stage
A draw was held to determine the pairings.

Round of 24

|}

Round of 16

|}

Quarterfinals

|}

Semifinals

|}

Third place game

|}

Final

|}

External links
Official Website
Men's tournament - Results
Women's tournament - Results

European Beach Volleyball Championships
European Beach Volleyball
European Beach Volleyball
International volleyball competitions hosted by Austria
Sports competitions in Klagenfurt